The Belarusian Council of Orthodox Churches in North America was a group of five parishes in the United States and Canada under the jurisdiction of the Ecumenical Patriarchate of Constantinople. They did not have their own bishop, but were rather administered by Metropolitan Nicholas of Amissos of the American Carpatho-Russian Orthodox Diocese (EP), who then reported to the primate of the Greek Orthodox Archdiocese of America. After several years under the Ecumenical Patriarchate the parishes returned to the Belarusian Autocephalous Orthodox Church.

External links
Eastern Christian Churches: The Belarusan Council of Orthodox Churches in North America, by Ronald Roberson, a Roman Catholic priest and scholar

Sources
OrthodoxWiki Source for Article

Belarusian-American history
Belarusian diaspora in North America
Eastern Orthodoxy in Canada
Eastern Orthodoxy in the United States